Judges who served on the Federal Court of Bankruptcy are:{|class="wikitable sortable" border="1" ||
|-
|+
! class="unsortable"| Position

! Name
! From
! To
! Term
! class="unsortable"|Comments
! class="unsortable"|Notes
|-
| rowspan="6" |  ||  || align="middle" |  || align="middle" |  ||  || Formerly a judge of the Supreme Court (Qld), judge of the Commonwealth Court of Conciliation and Arbitration.Subsequently a judge of the Supreme Court (ACT)|| 
|-
|  || align="middle" |  || align="middle" |  ||  || Chief Judge of the Commonwealth Court of Conciliation and Arbitration || 
|-
|  || align="middle" |  || align="middle" |  ||  || Formerly a judge of the County Court of Victoria (1939-1942)Subsequently a judge of the Supreme Court (ACT) (1943-1945) || 
|-
|  || align="middle" |  || align="middle" |  ||  || Judge of the Supreme Court (Qld) (1961–67) judge of the Supreme Court (ACT) (1967–70)Appointed to the High Court (1970–87)|| 
|-
|   || align="middle" |  || align="middle" |  || align=right| || Judge of the Commonwealth Industrial Court, Supreme Court (ACT) and Supreme Court (NT).Subsequently appointed to the Federal Court || 
|-
|  || align="middle" |  || align="middle" |  ||  || Appointed to the Federal Court || 
|-
|}

References

Federal Court of Bankruptcy